Audio Analytic is a British company headquartered in Cambridge, England that has developed a patented sound recognition software framework called ai3 which provides technology with the ability to understand context through sound. This framework includes an embeddable software platform that can react to a range of sounds such as smoke alarms and carbon monoxide alarms, window breakage, infant crying and dogs barking.

History

The company was based on founder Christopher Mitchell's doctoral research from Anglia Ruskin University, with seed investment from EEDA (East of England Development Agency) and local Cambridge Angels investors.

In 2022 Audio Analytic was bought by Facebook and Instagram owner Meta.

Products
Audio Analytic sells ai3, a software package that is embedded on a device, along with an assortment of sound profiles that the software can recognise, including warning alarms, window breakage, an infant crying, and voice activity.

Audio Analytic developed the Polyphonic Sound Detection Score (PSDS), a metric for evaluating the performance of sound recognition algorithms when applied to polyphonic sound recordings. They also released an accompanying software framework that implements the PSDS.

References

External links
 Official website

Software companies of the United Kingdom